Parastemon is a genus of plant in the family Chrysobalanaceae described as a genus in 1842. It is native to Southeast Asia and to Papuasia.

Species
 Parastemon grandifructus  - Sarawak, Sabah
 Parastemon urophyllus  - Nicobar Islands, Thailand, Peninsular Malaysia, Borneo, Sumatra
 Parastemon versteeghii  - Sulawesi, Maluku, New Guinea, Admiralty Islands

References

Chrysobalanaceae
Chrysobalanaceae genera
Taxonomy articles created by Polbot